Toxicoscordion micranthum,  the smallflower deathcamas, is a flowering plant in the genus Toxicoscordion. It is native to Oregon and California, primarily in the Coast Ranges from Douglas County to Napa and Sonoma Counties, with isolated populations in Lassen, Plumas, Santa Clara, and San Benito Counties. It is a member of the serpentine soils flora.

Toxicoscordion micranthum is a bulb-forming herb up to 70 cm tall and bearing as many as 60 flowers. Flowers are white or cream-colored, sometimes with green markings, 5–12 mm in diameter hence smaller than most of the other species in the genus.

References

External links

Jepson Manual Treatment, Zigadenus micranthus Eastw.
Calphotos Photo gallery, University of California @ Berkeley

micranthum
Flora of California
Flora of Oregon
Natural history of the California chaparral and woodlands
Natural history of the California Coast Ranges
Plants described in 1903
Flora without expected TNC conservation status